The Bullpasture River is a  tributary of the Cowpasture River of Virginia in the United States.

The Bullpasture River flows through Highland County, Virginia from its headwaters on the boundary between Virginia and West Virginia northwest of the village of Doe Hill, Virginia.  It flows southwest between Bullpasture Mountain and Jack Mountain until joining the Cowpasture River in Bath County, Virginia, below the hamlet of Williamsville.

The Cowpasture River joins the Jackson River to form the James River.

See also
 List of Virginia rivers

References

External links
 

Tributaries of the James River
Rivers of Virginia
Rivers of Bath County, Virginia
Rivers of Highland County, Virginia